Pride of America is the nineteenth studio album by American country music singer Charley Pride. It was released in 1974 on RCA Records. 

The album peaked at No. 4 on the Billboard Top Country Albums chart.

Production
The album was recorded at RCA's "Nashville Sound" Studios, Nashville, Tennessee. The vocal accompaniment was by the Jordanaires and the Nashville Edition.

Critical reception
In a retrospective article, Rolling Stone included "Mississippi Cotton Picking Delta Town"  on a list of Pride's 10 "essential" songs, writing that "Pride’s delivery perfectly splits the difference between a tender evocation of home and a stark memory of a world he was happy to have left behind."

Track listing

Production
Recording Engineer - Bill Vandevort
Recording Technicians - Dave Roys and Mike Shockley
Photography - John Donegan
Cover Graphics - Herb Burnette, Pinwheel Studios

References

1974 albums
Albums produced by Jerry Bradley (music executive)
Charley Pride albums
RCA Records albums